Carlos Eduardo Fernandes Léo (born January 1, 1976 in São Paulo, Brazil), known as Eduardo Kobra, nicknamed Kobra, is a street artist who officially began his career in 1987 at 11 years old, in his hometown of São Paulo. Since then he has painted over 3,000 murals on five different continents. Some of these murals are commissioned while others are his original, raw ideas. Kobra now works with a team of artists who paint between two and four murals each month. To this day Kobra continues to live and work in his hometown of São Paulo.

Early life 
Eduardo Kobra grew up in São Paulo, Brazil's largest city. His father was a weaver and his mother was a housewife.  He attended public school at Escola Municipal Mauricio Simão.  He did not get any official academic training, but became a well known, self-taught artist. Before he started his official art career, he enjoyed illegally tagging walls which eventually lead to several arrests throughout his teenage years.

Career 
Eduardo Kobra was influenced by both modern and contemporary artists all around the world. He was specifically influenced by muralists such as Banksy, Keith Haring and Diego Rivera. His artwork is highly research driven. He rooted his artworks in art history by painting famous artworks in his own style in hopes of not only inserting himself into history but also bringing awareness to São Paulo as a town. He researched the science behind human vision, architecture, urban space and tri-dimensional projects because he wanted to understand how to effectively paint in order to give his viewer a specific experience. Due to the realism of his murals and the 3-D design of his work, the viewer is often confused because the human eye has a hard time differentiating between sculpture and painting on a flat surface. This confusion is his ultimate goal in his murals. Before painting a work that is site specific, he researches the history and culture of the city in order to situate the art in a city conclusively.  Eduardo Kobra uses his own technique when it comes to street art. This technique involves airbrush and spray paint. By using these two mediums he is able to use immense detail, perfect aesthetic and rich light and shadow to make his objects appear 3-D.

The main goal of his work is to provide a space for the public to interact with his art. He did not want the public to have to go to a museum to see art, he wanted it to be accessible to all, thus pushing back against the difference between high and low art. During his teenage years Kobra ran with a well-known graffiti group known as "Hip Hop" in São Paulo which was who he began experimenting with street art as a career. By the 1990s Kobra made São Paulo the main site for contemporary street art. During this time, he began making posters for events that were held at the largest amusement park in Brazil, which was his first paid art job. The advertising he did for the amusement park was so successful that he began getting asked by other companies to produce advertisements for them.

In the early 2000s Kobra created his Memory Walls project. The goal of this project was to transform the appearance of an urban space through the means of a piece of art while also bringing back the lost memories of the city. He incorporated old photos of São Paulo that he spread throughout the town integrated within his trademark graffiti. This project was made up of smaller murals distributed throughout the city telling the story of the history of São Paulo while also showing the stark contrast between past São Paulo and the present São Paulo. In total, he used 10,000 square feet of space distributed around the city to complete his project. In 2007 the media got a hold of this project and began waiting with anticipation for what his next project would be.

In 2011, Kobra painted his first mural outside of Brazil in France. France invited him to come paint on a wall in a neighborhood on Lyon, France, that was revived. They wanted to remember this time in their history and show the process of their revival in hopes of never losing sight of what their neighborhood has been through. In 2017, Madonna invited Kobra to paint two murals at Mercy James Institute for Pediatric Surgery and Intensive Care in Malawi after she saw his Fight for Street Art mural, which depicts Andy Warhol and Jean-Michel Basquiat.

His career has continued as he is a still a practicing artist, painting in different countries around the world.

Legacy 
In 2016 Kobra painted the then largest mural titled Ethnic Groups which celebrated the 2016 Olympic games. Then in 2017 he surpassed his own record when he painted a street mural that was 5,742 square meters.

Kobra has worked for a number of large organizations and public figures such as Playcenter, Beto Carrero World, Coca-Cola, Nestlé, Chevrolet, Ford, Roché, Johnie Walker, Londice Cacau show and Carmim.

Work
The following table lists Kobra's major works.

Analysis of individual artworks 

V-J Day in Time Square, 2012
 Eduardo Kobra draws his inspiration for this work of art from Alfred Eisenstaedt's famous photograph taken in 1945 in New York. Kobra takes this artwork and situates it in its original historical context by painting a scene below his depiction of Sailor Kissing Woman, of Time Square in 1945 which was the same year this photo was taken. This artwork is a celebration of Japan’s surrender to the Allies, ending World War II. The colorfulness of Kobra's final product gave the original photograph life in contemporary society.
Oscar Niemeyer, 2013
 Painted in 2013, this is one of Kobra's biggest and most well-known murals. He painted Oscar Niemeyer on one of São Paulo's busiest street. This mural covers an entire side of the building and is 52 meters tall and took 40 days to complete. This mural depicts a famous Brazilian architect, Oscar Niemeyer who passed away at the age of 104 in 2012 and is meant to honor his legacy.
Abraham Lincoln, 2013
 Kobra was invited to paint a mural of Abraham Lincoln in his home state of Kentucky in 2013. He took the infamous state of Lincoln which stands in the National Mall in Washington D.C. and overlaid his own style. He painted this mural on the outside of a theater which evokes Lincoln's death, but by using the statue that honors his abolition of slavery the viewer is able to see how his influence has not died in the theater, but continues to live on.
O Candango, 2014
 Painted in 2014, in Brasilia, Brazil, this mural honors all of the labors who made it possible for Brasilia to be the capital of Brazil. Historically the building of the capital is credited to the President Juscelino Kubitschek who was the brain behind the Republic’s new seat which completely changed the economy of Brazil. What is often forgotten are the thousands of laborers who moved from all over the country to Brasilia to work for the government, enduring awful living conditions to make the capital of Brasilia possible. These were the individuals that Kobra believed needed to be honored because without them the capital would not have been possible.
The Times They Are A-Changin', 2015
 Painted in 2015, in Minneapolis, Minnesota this is a mural depicting Bob Dylan, native to Minnesota in three distinctive phases of his life on the outside of a remodeled office building known as housing ‘new-economy’ companies. Taking one of Bob Dylan’s famous quotes such as this and proclaiming it on the outside of a building where everyone can see it depicts that the economy is changing which changes the city as a whole.
Olhares da Paz (Stars of Peace), 2015
 Painted in 2015 in Los Angeles, California this mural reminds the viewer that there is still hope in the depraved world. The mural depicts individuals who have given hope to the world throughout their lives and honors them. Some of the individuals depicted include Mother Teresa, John Lennon, Alfred Novel and Bob Marley.

Exhibitions 
The following table lists Kobra's major exhibitions.

References

External links

1976 births
Living people
Brazilian muralists
People from São Paulo